Benjamin Onwuachi (born 9 April 1984 in Lagos) is a Nigerian footballer who plays as a striker. Onwuachi started his career in the youth ranks of Reggiana. He continued in the academies of Juventus where he didn't manage to establish himself in the first team. He then moved to Belgium to play for Standard Liège. After a season in Belgium he moved to Greece in 2006, where he played for several clubs having also spells in Albania and Cyprus.

Club career
He began his career in Reggiana academies in Italy in 2002. In 2003, he played only a game scoring one goal for Juventus (he was purchased by Juventus for €420,000). In the 2004–2005 season he went on loan to Salernitana where he played 18 games and scored 6 goals. The 2005–06 season he signed a 2-year deal with Belgian side Standard Liège but failed to play a single match.

Ionikos
The 2006–07 season, he went to Greece and joined the team at Nikaia of Ionikos. He noted 42 participations and had 7 goals. That same season Ionikos fell in the Second National Division of Greece, Beta Ethniki 2007-08, and he decided to leave the club. The administration of Ionikos did not agree with this, but unfortunately they did not manage to change his decision.

In October 2007, he returned to Nikaia, at Ionikos, at a point where the club campaigned for a promotion in the Super League Greece. That year he played in 27 games and had 14 goals, so that he ranked 3rd in the scorerlist of the division! Unfortunately the club did not achieve promotion to the first division. In the match against PAS Giannena which Ionikos won 4–1, Onwuachi scored 2 goals.

APOEL
The next year the budget of Ionikos fell and in July 2008, Onwuachi went on loan to APOEL. For APOEL he played in 23 games in the championship and scored 8 goals helping the team to win the Cypriot First Division and the Super Cup of season 2008–09. In May 2009, the player and the chairman of APOEL, Phivos Erotokritou, did not agree on signing a new contract and Onwuachi returned to Greece to Ionikos.

Kavala
On 20 August 2009, he signed a 4-years contract with the newly promoted in Super League Greece team of Kavala. His first season with his new team, was excellent because he became 4th in top scorers of Super League Greece, scoring 10 goals. In August 2011, FIFA canceled his contract with the club after they failed to pay his salary for two consecutive months.

AEL Limassol
On 25 August 2011, he signed with AEL Limassol in Cyprus, but he was released from the club in January 2012.

Panetolikos
On 26 January 2012, he returned to Greece and signed a 6-month contract with Panetolikos.  On 26 April 2012, after the conclusion of the season,  Onwuachi and Panetolikos parted their ways, as he couldn't fit into the team.

Skoda Xanthi
On 6 June 2012, Onwuachi signed a contract with Xanthi.

Iraklis 1908
On 19 July 2013, Onwuachi signed a contract with Iraklis. He made his league debut for Iraklis on 30 September 2013 in an away loss against Kavala. He scored his first goal for the club on 13 January 2013, in an away win against Ethnikos Gazoros.

Statistics
Last updated 1 June 2012

Honours
APOEL
 Cypriot First Division: 2008–09
 Cypriot Super Cup: 2008

References

External links

1984 births
Living people
Nigerian footballers
Nigerian expatriate footballers
Serie B players
Super League Greece players
Football League (Greece) players
Cypriot First Division players
Juventus F.C. players
U.S. Salernitana 1919 players
Standard Liège players
APOEL FC players
Ionikos F.C. players
Kavala F.C. players
AEL Limassol players
Panetolikos F.C. players
Iraklis Thessaloniki F.C. players
ASC Oțelul Galați players
Liga I players
Expatriate footballers in Greece
Nigerian expatriate sportspeople in Greece
Expatriate footballers in Cyprus
Expatriate footballers in Romania
Expatriate footballers in Italy
Association football forwards